"Chemistry" is a song by American rock band Semisonic. It was their first single on their 2001 album, All About Chemistry. Released to radio on January 8, 2001, it reached number six on the US Billboard Adult Alternative Songs chart, number 21 in New Zealand, number 35 in the United Kingdom, and number 39 in Ireland.

Music video
The music video for this song was filmed in 2000 in a house in Silver Lake, California. The video was directed by Liz Friedlander. It features the journey of a small silver ball which, at one stage, passes through a Rube Goldberg machine, and includes a series of domestic disasters.

Track listings

UK CD single
 "Chemistry" (single edit)
 "Over My Head"
 "Chemistry" (The Drumhammer remix)
 "Chemistry" (video)

UK cassette single
 "Chemistry" (single edit)
 "Over My Head"

European CD single
 "Chemistry" (radio edit)
 "Girlfriend"

European and Australian maxi-CD single
 "Chemistry" (radio edit) – 3:53
 "Girlfriend" – 3:44
 "Chemistry" (The Drumhammer remix) – 6:40
 "Chemistry" (enhanced video)

Charts

Release history

References

2001 singles
2001 songs
MCA Records singles
Music videos directed by Liz Friedlander
Semisonic songs
Songs written by Dan Wilson (musician)